Creation is a 1922 British silent drama film directed by Humberston Wright and starring Dorothy Fane, Frank Dane and Simeon Stuart. It is based on the novel The Man Who Dared by May Edginton.

Cast
 Dorothy Fane as Zena Hammond  
 Frank Dane as Faux Evermore  
 Simeon Stuart as Dr. Ganally 
 William Freshman 
 Kate Gurney 
 Raleigh King 
 Thelma Murray 
 Beryl Norton

References

Bibliography
 Goble, Alan. The Complete Index to Literary Sources in Film. Walter de Gruyter, 1999.

External links
 

1922 films
1922 drama films
British drama films
British silent feature films
Films based on British novels
British black-and-white films
1920s English-language films
1920s British films
Silent drama films